Nicolas Bourbon (1574, Vendeuvre-sur-Barse – 6 August 1644, Paris) was a French clergyman and neo-Latin poet.  He wrote in Latin under the name of Nicolaus Borbonius, and under the pseudonyms Horatius Gentilis and Petrus Mola.

Son of a doctor, he studied under political satirist and poet Jean Passerat.  Bourbon then held a professorship at the Collège de France and was admitted into the Oratory of Saint Philip Neri in 1630.  He was elected the second occupant of Académie française seat 29 in 1637.

References 
 Academie-Francaise biography (French-language)

1574 births
1644 deaths
People from Aube
17th-century French writers
17th-century French male writers
French poets
Members of the Académie Française
French male poets